Powellichthys is a genus of eels in the family Chlopsidae. The sole species is  Powellichthys ventriosus, which inhabits tropical reefs around the Cook Islands in the central western Pacific Ocean. It is a non-migratory species.

References

Eels
Chlopsidae
Monotypic fish genera